2010 Finnish Cup was the 56th season of the main annual football (soccer) cup competition in Finland. It was organized as a single-elimination knock–out tournament.

Participation in the competition was voluntary. The winners of the competition entered the second qualifying round of UEFA Europa League.

A total of 271 teams registered for the competition. They entered in different rounds, depending on their position within the league system. Clubs with teams in Kolmonen (level IV) or an inferior league, as well as Veterans and Junior teams, started the competition in Round 1. Teams from Ykkönen (level II) and Kakkonen (level III) entered in Round 3. Veikkausliiga clubs started in Round 4 with the exceptions of Inter Turku, FC Honka, TPS and HJK Helsinki. These four teams entered in Round 5 because they had qualified for European competitions after the 2009 season.

The tournament started on 30 January 2010 with the First Round and concluded with the Final held on 25 September 2010 at Sonera Stadium, Helsinki.

Round 1
The draw for this round was conducted on 14 January 2010. 220 teams were drawn into 110 matches for this round. Unlike last year, there was no need to award byes. The matches were played between 30 January and 28 February 2010.

Round 2
The draw for this round was conducted on 14 January 2010. The 110 winners of the Second Round were drawn into 55 matches for this round. The matches were played between 3 and 28 March 2010.

Round 3
The draw for this round took place on 19 March 2010. This round includes the 55 winners from the previous round and the 37 clubs from the Ykkönen 2010 and Kakkonen 2010 seasons that entered into the competition. These clubs were drawn into 46 matches that took place between 1 and 15 April 2010.

Round 4
The draw for this round took place on 8 April 2010. This round includes the 46 winners of the previous round and the 10 2010 Veikkausliiga clubs that entered this competition who are not involved in European competitions for the 2010-11 cycle. This includes all the clubs in the league competition except for Inter Turku, FC Honka, TPS and HJK Helsinki, who will be entering the competition in the round following this one. These 28 matches were played between 20 and 29 April 2010.

Round 5
This round included the 28 winners from the previous round and the 4 2010 Veikkausliiga clubs involved in European competition in the 2009-10 cycle: Inter Turku, FC Honka, TPS and HJK Helsinki. These matches were played on 11, 12, 13 and 18 May 2010.

Round 6
This round included the 16 winners of the previous round. These matches were played on 26 and 27 May 2010.

Quarter-finals
This round included the eight winners from the previous round.

Semi-finals
This round includes the four quarter-final winners.

Final
The two semi-final winners participated in this match.

References

External links
 Official page 

Finnish Cup seasons
Finnish Cup
Cup